"I.O.U. (I Owe You)" is a song written by Kerry Chater and Austin Roberts, and performed by American country music artist Lee Greenwood.  It was released in March 1983 the first single from his album Somebody's Gonna Love You.

The single peaked at number 6 on the U.S. country charts and number 4 in Canada. It also peaked at number 4 on the U.S. adult contemporary charts. Other than "God Bless the U.S.A.", it is Greenwood's biggest crossover hit, peaking at number 53 on the Billboard Hot 100. The song has been covered numerous times, the version by the German band  becoming a well-known pop song in South Korea.

Charts

Weekly charts

Year-end charts

Bill Tarmey version
In 1994, English actor/singer Bill Tarmey released his version as a single, from his second album Time for Love. It reached No. 55 on the UK Singles Chart.

References

1983 singles
1983 songs
1994 singles
Lee Greenwood songs
Bill Tarmey songs
Songs written by Kerry Chater
MCA Records singles
Songs written by Austin Roberts (singer)
Song recordings produced by Jerry Crutchfield